Thermosphaeroma milleri is a species of isopod in the family Sphaeromatidae. It is found in Mexico.

The IUCN conservation status of Thermosphaeroma milleri is "EN", endangered. The species faces a high risk of extinction in the near future. The IUCN status was reviewed in 1996.

References

Sphaeromatidae
Articles created by Qbugbot
Crustaceans described in 1981